Ateliers de Construction Aéronautique de Zeebruges (ACAZ) also known as Zeebrugge Aeronautical Construction Company (Zacco) was a Belgian aircraft manufacturer of the 1920s, based in Zeebrugge.

The company built a number of innovative prototypes, but due largely to indifference by the Belgian government, the company folded without having put a single design into mass production.

List of Aircraft
ACAZ T.1  (1924) Single-engine monoplane. One built and destroyed during a test flight.
ACAZ T.2  (1924) Single-engine monoplane.  One of world's first all-metal monoplane.  One built
ACAZ C.2  (1926) Single-engine two-seat fighter/reconnaissance all-metal biplane.  One built

References

Defunct aircraft manufacturers of Belgium
Companies based in West Flanders